San Carlos is a district (distrito) of West Panamá Province in Panama. The population according to the 2000 census was 15,541; the latest official estimate (for 2019) is 24,001. The district covers a total area of 338 km². The capital lies at the city of San Carlos.

Administrative divisions
San Carlos District is divided administratively into the following corregimientos:

San Carlos (capital)
El Espino
El Higo
Guayabito, La Ermita
La Laguna
Las Uvas
Los Llanitos
San José

References

Districts of Panamá Oeste Province